is a mountain in Niigata Prefecture, Japan. It has an elevation of 879 meters.

External links
 Kōmyō-san (879m)
 Kōmyō-san 879m 2005.11.5

Komyo